Szczyrzyc  (formerly Szczyrzyce) is a village in Poland, located in the Lesser Poland Voivodeship, Limanowa County, Jodłownik Commune. Geographically it is located in the Beskid Wyspowy, in the Stradomka river valley.

Szczyrzyc is notable for its 13th-century Cistercian abbey (the Cistercians Abbey in Szczyrzyc). The village itself dates from the 14th century. It is the birthplace of Władysław Orkan and Zygmunt Konieczny, and the only place where the Polish Red cattle still exist.

In the Kingdom of Poland and Polish–Lithuanian Commonwealth, Szczyrzyc was the seat of Szczyrzyc County - a large county, which stretched from the Vistula to the Tatras, and which was disbanded in 1772.

References

External links 
Cistercian Abbey in Szczyrzyc

Villages in Limanowa County